Jonas Truchanovičius (born 23 June 1993) is a Lithuanian handball player who plays for TVB Stuttgart and the Lithuania national team.

Accomplishments
EHF Champions League: (1)
 Champion: 2017–18
Lithuanian Handball League: (5)
 Champions: 2010, 2011, 2013, 2014, 2015

Awards 
 2020 Lithuanian Male Handball Player of the Year

References

Lithuanian male handball players
Sportspeople from Šiauliai
Living people
1993 births
Expatriate handball players
Lithuanian expatriate sportspeople in France